Tetley is a major worldwide tea brand.

Tetley may also refer to:
Tetley's Brewery, an English brewery and beer brand
The Tetley (Leeds), a contemporary art and learning centre in Leeds

People with the surname Tetley:
Glen Tetley (1926–2007), American modern dancer and choreographer
Joshua Tetley (1778–1859), English founder of the Tetley's brewery
James Noel Tetley (1898–1971), member of Tetley brewing family and Army officer
Nigel Tetley (1924–1972), South African-English naval officer, circumnavigated the world in a trimaran
Walter Tetley (1915–1975), American voice actor
William Tetley (born 1927), Canadian lawyer and law professor
Joseph Dresser Tetley, a 19th-century member of the New Zealand Legislative Council